Radotinib (INN; trade name Supect), and sometimes referred to by its investigational name IY5511, is a drug for the treatment of different types of cancer, most notably Philadelphia chromosome-positive (Ph+) chronic myeloid leukemia (CML) with resistance or intolerance of other Bcr-Abl tyrosine-kinase inhibitors, such as patients resistant or intolerant to imatinib.

Radotinib is being developed by Ilyang Pharmaceutical Co., Ltd of South Korea and is co-marketed by Daewoong Pharmaceutical Co. Ltd, in South Korea. Radotinib completed a multi-national Phase II clinical trial study in 2012 and in August 2011, Ilyang initiated a Phase III, multinational, multi-center, open-label, randomized study for first-line indication. Its mechanism of action involves inhibition of the Bcr-Abl tyrosine kinase  and of platelet-derived growth factor receptor (PDGFR).

References

Benzamides
Imidazoles
Pyrazines
Aminopyrimidines
Tyrosine kinase inhibitors
Trifluoromethyl compounds